Luis Gerardo Garza Cisneros (born September 19, 1979 in Monterrey, Nuevo León, México), better known as his stage name Chetes, is a Mexican rock musician, well known for being the leader of the influential Avanzada Regia rock bands Zurdok, Vaquero and eventually, his own solo career.

Biography
Chetes was born and raised in Monterrey, Mexico.  His father was a founding member of the rock band Los Rockets, which led to Chetes' interest in music. At age 7, he learned classic guitar, and started to like artists such as the Beatles and the Beach Boys. At the age of 12, he attempted to learn how to play drums, but this project was quickly abandoned when neighbors complained about the noise. When MTV arrived in the city, Chetes got even more excited about rock music so he learned about guitar distortion. This is a method of playing guitar where the sound is distorted, but the actual guitar remains intact.

Chetes then joined the band Zurdok in 1993, which was formed by Fletch Sáenz and David Izquierdo. The band received a recording contract to Discos Manicomio when he was only 16. With Zurdok, Garza recorded 3 albums: Antena, Hombre Sintetizador and Maquillaje. In 2002, Zurdok disbanded due to artistic differences and Chetes took a break. In 2005, Zurdok bandmate Maurizio Terracina and Garza created a new project band together with Rodrigo Guardiola called Vaquero, where their songs are completely in English. Chetes picked up a considerable number of new fans, due to the predominance of English as a world language.

Vaquero is currently in hiatus and it remains unknown if they will record a sequel to their debut eponymous album.

Chetes already had enough material of his own to cut a record. "Una Pieza" (One More Time or Figure Out) and "Poco a Poco" were written during the Vaquero era, but they did not fit into the band concept. So, by sending demos, Ken Coomer, ex-drummer of Wilco and Uncle Tupelo got hooked on Chetes's sound and decided to be the producer of his first solo album. Garza flew to Nashville in October 2005, recording and writing songs with Coomer and his engineer, Charlie Brocco. These songs were recorded in track and had no electronic instrumentation, being heavily influenced by The Beatles and The Beach Boys.

In May 2006, Blanco Fácil, the title of the album, was released. So far, it has sold nearly 50,000 copies, the benchmark for being certified gold in Mexico. The first single on "Blanco Fácil", "Completamente", led to a 2006 Latin Grammy nomination for best rock song, some heavy iTunes Latino promotion, and a much-played video that features a bundled-up Garza singing his way down the streets of Beijing. The second single is "Poco a poco" and there is a scheduled third single "Que me maten".

Chetes also collaborated with Amaral in the cover of Miguel Bosé's song "Si tu No Vuelves" for the soundtrack of the movie Efectos secundarios and with Emmanuel del Real with the song "16 de Febrero" for the movie "Fuera del Cielo".

In April 2008, Chetes released his second album Efecto Dominó.

Discography

With Zurdok

Antena – 1997
Hombre Sintetizador – August 1999
Maquillaje – June 2001
lo mejor de Zurdok (Compilation album) – 2007

With Vaquero
Vaquero EP – 2004
Vaquero – 2005

Solo
Blanco Fácil – May 2006
Efecto Dominó – March 2008
Hipnosis- May 2010
Cardio Sapien EP – Aug 2012
Stereotipos – Feb 2016
Odisea Magnetica – 2019

Notes

General references
Publimetro
Coca-Cola

External links
Official Page

1979 births
Mexican rock musicians
Living people
Rock en Español musicians
Latin music songwriters
Rock songwriters